Bat coronavirus RaTG13 is a SARS-like betacoronavirus that infects the horseshoe bat Rhinolophus affinis. It was discovered in 2013 in bat droppings from a mining cave near the town of Tongguan in Mojiang county in Yunnan, China. In February 2020, it was identified as the closest known (at the time) relative of SARS-CoV-2, the virus that causes COVID-19, sharing 96.1% nucleotide similarity. However, in 2022, scientists found three closer matches in bats found 530 km south, in Feuang, Laos, designated as BANAL-52 (96.8% similarity), BANAL-103 and BANAL-236.

History 
In spring 2012, three miners cleaning bat feces in an abandoned copper mine near the town of Tongguan in Mojiang Hani Autonomous County developed fatal pneumonia. Out of concerns that the miner's cases could represent a novel disease, serum samples collected from the miners were sent to the Wuhan Institute of Virology and tested by Shi Zhengli and her group for Ebola virus, Nipah virus, and bat SARSr-CoV Rp3. The samples tested negative.

In order to discover the possible cause of the infection, different animals (including bats, rats, and musk shrews) were sampled  in and around the mining cave. Between 2012 and 2015, Shi Zhengli and her group isolated 293 diverse coronaviruses (284 alphacoronaviruses and 9 betacoronaviruses) from bat feces samples in the cave. One of the samples collected in 2013 from Rhinolophus affinis bat feces was the bat coronavirus RaTG13. The strain name was derived from the originating bat species, geographic location, and year collected. 

In 2020, Shi and her group retested the serum samples from the miners for SARS-CoV-2. The samples tested negative.

In 2020, the virus was renamed from the original Ra4991 to RatG13, to reflect the species of bat from which the virus was collected (Rhinolophus affinis), the location where it was collected (Tongguan) and the year of the sample’s collection (2013). The change of name of the virus has been considered as innuendo by lab leak advocates.

Virology 
RaTG13 is a positive-strand RNA virus with an outer membrane. Its genome is approximately 29,800 nucleotides. The genome encodes a replicase (ORF1a/1b) and four structural proteins; including a spike protein (S), membrane protein (M), envelope protein (E) and nucleocapsid protein (N); and five viral accessory proteins, including ORF3a (NS3), ORF6 (NS6), ORF7a (NS7a), ORF7b (NS7b) and ORF8 (NS8).

RaTG13 bears strong resemblance to the SARS-CoV-2 virus (it shares 96.1% nucleotide similarity), and its existence is a supporting piece of evidence for SARS-CoV-2's natural origin. The difference between RaTG13 and SARS-CoV-2 is in the receptor-binding domain (RBD) of the spike protein (S), which is the portion that binds to the receptor protein on the surface of the host cell and causes infection, indicating that the RaTG13 virus might not use angiotensin-converting enzyme 2 (ACE2) as its entry site into the cell as does SARS-CoV-2. Further, the S protein of RaTG13 virus lacks the furin cleavage motif RRAR↓S.

The binding affinity between RATG13 and hACE2 is lower than that between SARS-CoV-2 RBD and hACE2.

Phylogenetics

Phylogenetic tree

See also 
 Bat SARS-like coronavirus RsSHC014
 Bat SARS-like coronavirus WIV1
 Mòjiāng virus

References 

SARS-CoV-2
Bat virome
Coronaviridae
Animal virology
Sarbecovirus
Zoonoses